CHIJMES Hall was the former Convent of the Holy Infant Jesus Chapel located at the CHIJMES complex in Singapore. The former chapel was designed by Father Charles Benedict Nain, it currently serves as a function hall venue for weddings and corporate events.

History
The First Chapel of the Convent of the Holy Infant Jesus was built and consecrated in Singapore on 1855 for the Town Convent. As the old dilapidating chapel had become hazardous, the Sisters of the Holy Infant Jesus had to celebrate mass at the Caldwell House. They soon started fund-raising by various means for the new chapel to replace the former.

Architecture
In 1898, Father Charles Benedict Nain, an architect and priest of Church of Saints Peter and Paul, designed a new Gothic Revival chapel for the Convent. The architectural firm Swan and Maclaren would oversaw the construction of the chapel. The chapel's stained-glass windows imported from Bruges, Belgium in 1904 were designed by Jules Dobbelaere.

A five-storey spire flanked by flying buttresses marked the entrance to the chapel. The 648 capitals on the columns of the chapel and its corridors each bear a unique impression of tropical flora and birds.

Consecration
The new Convent of the Holy Infant Jesus Chapel was completed in 1903 and consecrated on 11 June 1904. The Entrance Gate pillars were later added to the front of the Chapel on the same year.

Deconsecration
In 1983, the Singapore Government had acquired the land from the Convent. The last mass was held at the chapel on 3 November 1983 before it was deconsecrated for non-religious use.

Restoration
The Urban Redevelopment Authority put up the site for sale in March 1990 and gazetted the Convent of the Holy Infant Jesus Chapel and Caldwell House as national monuments on 26 October 1990, in order to preserve the ambience of the remaining buildings and designated the entire complex as a conservation area, with high restoration standards and strict usage guidelines. The remaining buildings, the Convent of the Holy Infant Jesus Chapel, Caldwell House, and the remaining former school blocks underwent extensive restoration works in 1991 and reopened as a complex known as CHIJMES in 1996.

The former chapel has since been renamed to CHIJMES Hall. Its function hall is managed by the Watabe Singapore, and currently serves as a venue for wedding and corporate functions.

Gallery

In popular culture
The wedding scene in Crazy Rich Asians took place in this former chapel.

External links
CHIJMES website

References 

Tourist attractions in Singapore
Landmarks in Singapore
National monuments of Singapore
Religious buildings and structures completed in 1903
Downtown Core (Singapore)
UNESCO Asia-Pacific Heritage Awards winners
20th-century architecture in Singapore